Ken Wenman (born 9 March 1955) is a Canadian athlete. He competed in the men's pole vault at the 1976 Summer Olympics.

References

1955 births
Living people
Athletes (track and field) at the 1976 Summer Olympics
Canadian male pole vaulters
Olympic track and field athletes of Canada
Athletes from Vancouver